Maniben.com is a comedy show on SAB TV. It was based on Gujarati play of the same name. It premiered on 8 June 2009. The show had  Smriti Irani as the lead.

Cast
 Smriti Irani as Mani
 Nitin Vakharia as Jaman Kumar Patel
 Manini De as Sunaina Jobanputra
 Dilip Rawal as Pranav Jobanputra
 Dolly Bindra as Pammi
 Simple Kaul as Nikita
 Dhawal Barbhaya
 Bijal Batavia as Rimi
 Anand Goradia as Rishi
 Sudha Shivpuri as Rimi's mother-in-law a.k.a. Baa
 Kurush Deboo as Dr. Goliwalla

External links
 Official Website
 Preview

See also
 Kyunki Saas Bhi Kabhi Bahu Thi

Sony SAB original programming
Indian comedy television series
2010 Indian television series endings